This is a list of equipment used by the Myanmar Army.

Small arms

Land mines

Anti-tank weapons

Mortars

Tanks

Armoured vehicles

Utility vehicles

Multiple launch rocket systems

Artillery systems

Ballistic missiles

Air defence systems

Anti-aircraft guns

Radars 
The following list includes the radar systems in service with the Myanmar Army Artillery Corps and the Bureau of Air Defence.

Unmanned aerial vehicles

Historical equipment 
This table include only the retired equipments of Myanmar Army.

Small arms

Anti-tank weapons

Mortars

Tanks and armoured vehicles

Gallery

References
Citations

Bibliography

Army
Myanmar
Army
Army Equipment